Harry Bruce McGregor (7 January 1903 in Broken Hill, New South Wales – 21 March 1990) was an Australian rules footballer who played with West Adelaide and South Adelaide in the South Australian National Football League (SANFL). His son Ken also played for West Adelaide and was a successful tennis player. Former Crows player, Ken McGregor is not related.

Career
McGregor made his debut at the age of 16 for West Broken Hill in the Broken Hill Football League where he was a Hurley Medallist in 1922. McGregor was recruited by West Adelaide in 1923 after attempts were made for his signature by both Norwood and Port Adelaide. McGregor played 102 games for West Adelaide between 1923 and 1929 and was appointed captain-coach of the team in 1926, leading them to the 1927 SANFL Premiership with a 10.10 (70) to 8.10 (58) win over North Adelaide at the Adelaide Oval.

In 1926 and 1927 McGregor became the first and as of 2011 West Adelaide's only dual Magarey Medallist and the club's only player to win the award back-to-back. He represented South Australia at the interstate level 22 times during his career. Records vary, but it is possible that McGregor also won as many as six Best All Round Player Awards during his time at Westies. What is known is that he won the award in 1924, 1925, 1926 and 1927.

With the economic privations of the Depression beginning to hit home in 1930, McGregor, along with team mate Bob Snell, the 1929 Magarey Medallist, was lured to Tasmania where the money on offer was significantly better than in Adelaide. After two seasons as captain-coach of North Hobart in the Tasmanian Football League (TFL) where the team finished as beaten Grand Finalists in both 1930 and 1931, he returned to the SANFL and joined South Adelaide. He played just two games before standing down as a player but coached the club for the rest of the year with Souths 'winning' the wooden spoon by finishing eighth. In 1933 he was appointed coach of the Glenelg Football Club and in 1934 he coached the club to their first ever SANFL Premiership.

McGregor then returned to West Adelaide to coach the team in 1937 but his three seasons in charge saw the Wests finish seventh in each season. He was replaced for 1940, but returned in 1941, and along with Colin Smith, coached the vastly improved team to finish third with a 12-5 record. West then won their semi-final clash with Port Adelaide before ending their season with a loss to eventual SANFL Premiers Norwood in the preliminary-final at the Adelaide Oval.

Family
Bruce McGregor and his wife Winnifred had two children. His daughter Betty was born in 1927 on the day Bruce won his second Magarey Medal and son Ken McGregor (born 1929) who went on to play for both West Adelaide and South Australia with distinction in the 1950s. Ken also played tennis at the highest level including representing Australia in three Davis Cup-winning sides (1950, 1951 and 1952) and won the 1952 Australian Open tennis – Men's Singles title at Adelaide's Memorial Drive, as well as the 1951 and 1952 Australian, French and Wimbledon and 1951 US Open men's doubles championships with Frank Sedgman.

See also
 1927 Melbourne Carnival

Footnotes

External links
WAFC Magarey Medallists - Harry Bruce McGregor
SA Football Hall of Fame - H (Bruce) McGregor

1903 births
1990 deaths
West Adelaide Football Club players
South Adelaide Football Club players
North Hobart Football Club players
West Adelaide Football Club coaches
North Hobart Football Club coaches
Glenelg Football Club coaches
South Adelaide Football Club coaches
Magarey Medal winners
Australian rules footballers from New South Wales
South Australian Football Hall of Fame inductees
West Broken Hill Football Club players